Pochette is a French word for "little pocket", it may refer to:

 Pochette (musical instrument), a small bowed lute box
 A type of small handbag

See also
 Pochette Surprise (Surprise Package)